The Moyar Power House is a hydroelectric power station located in the Nilgiris, Tamil Nadu, India.  It is run by the Tamil Nadu State Electricity Board.  It is 48 km from Ooty and 36 km from Gudalur.  The power plant is situated at the bottom of the Moyar Gorge and is accessed by a winch system from the plateau above.

Details
The installed capacity of power house is 36MW, consisting of 3 units with 12MW capacity each. The first two units were commissioned in 1960, and the third was commissioned in 1964.

The elevation of the power station is 609 meters and the water source for the power house is from Moyar Forebay Dam, Maravakandy Dam, Pyakara Power House tail race and has a dam capacity of 446.25 Cusec.

See also

 Kundah hydro-electric power house
 Kateri hydro-electric system
 Maravakandy hydro-electric Power House
 Pykara

References

Hydroelectric power stations in Tamil Nadu
Buildings and structures in Nilgiris district
1960 establishments in Madras State
Energy infrastructure completed in 1960
20th-century architecture in India